Tyuysk (Töy) is a rural locality (a village) in Askinsky Selsoviet, Askinsky District, Bashkortostan, Russia. The population was 257 as of 2010. There are 8 streets.

Geography 
Tyuysk is located 26 km south of Askino (the district's administrative centre) by road. Talog is the nearest rural locality.

References 

Rural localities in Askinsky District